American Son is a studio album by American country rock musician Levon Helm, who is most famous for his work as drummer for the rock group the Band. It was released in October 1980 on MCA Records and was Helm's third studio album. It had generally been considered Levon Helm's best solo work until the release of Dirt Farmer in 2007.

Background 
Helm played the part of Loretta Lynn's father in the 1980 film Coal Miner's Daughter and was asked to record a version of Bill Monroe's "Blue Moon of Kentucky" for the film's soundtrack. The session went well, and producer Fred Carter, Jr., decided to cut more tracks. Using a band of veteran Nashville session players, Carter and Helm recorded 20 tracks over two weeks, half of which ended up on American Son.

Critical reception
Billboard's reviewers noted that the album was more rock-like than country-like and pleasant to listen to. The authors also suggested that due to the success of the film, which starred Levon Helm, sales of the disc will be high.

Track listing 
 "Watermelon Time in Georgia" (Harlan Howard) – 3:53
 "Dance Me Down Easy" (Larry Henley, Billy Burnette) – 2:51
 "Violet Eyes" (Tom Kimmel) – 3:10
 "Stay with Me" (Fred Carter) – 3:03
 "America's Farm" (Ronnie Rogers) – 3:09
 "Hurricane" (Keith Stegall, Stewart Harris, Thom Schuyler) – 4:04
 "China Girl" (Joe New, Jeff Silbar) – 3:19
 "Nashville Wimmin" (Howard) – 4:13
 "Blue House of Broken Hearts" (Bill Martin, Todd Cerney) – 3:29
 "Sweet Peach Georgia Wine" (Ronnie Reynolds) – 3:51

Personnel 

 Levon Helm – drums, vocals, backing vocals, harmonica
 Jerry Shook – guitar, mandolin
 Buddy Emmons – steel guitar
 Kenneth Buttrey – drums
 Jerry Carrigan – drums
 Hargus "Pig" Robbins – piano, electric piano
 Bobby Ogdin – organ, electric piano
 Billy Sanford – guitar
 Henry Strzelecki – bass, backing vocals
 Mitch Humphries – organ, backing vocals
 Steve Gibson – guitar, electric guitar
 Steve Schaffer – bass
 Clifford Robertson – organ
 Beegie Adair – piano
 Todd Cerney – backing vocals
 Buzz Cason – backing vocals
 Buster Phillips – drums

Technical personnel 

 Jim Foglesong – executive producer
 Fred Carter, Jr. – producer, arranger, guitar, backing vocals
 Joe Mills – engineer
 Ernie Winfrey – engineer
 Bobby Bradley – assistant engineer
 George Osaki – art direction
 Andy Engel – design
 Joo Chung – cover illustration

Chart performance

References 

1980 albums
Levon Helm albums
MCA Records albums